Derbyshire County Cricket Club in 1933 was the cricket season when the English club Derbyshire had been playing for sixty two years. It was their thirty-fifth season in the County Championship and they won eleven matches to finish sixth.

1933 season

Derbyshire played 28 games in the County Championship, and one match against the  touring West Indians.   They won eleven of their games in the County Championship and lost eleven to come sixth. This was an advance on tenth place in the previous year and a further step on the road towards winning the championship in 1936. They drew with the West Indians.

A. W. Richardson was in his third season as captain in 1933. Leslie Townsend was top scorer. Tommy Mitchell took most wickets. 
 
George Pope, the second of the three Pope brothers to play for the county,  made his debut in the season. He was a useful all-rounder who added strength to the Derbyshire side for many years.

Matches

{| class="wikitable" style="width:100%;"
|-
! style="background:#efefef;" colspan="6"| List of  matches
|- style="background:#efefef;"
!No.
!Date
!V
!Result 
!Margin
!Notes
|- 
|1
|13 May 1933
| Yorkshire The Circle, Hull 
 |bgcolor="#FF0000"|Lost 
| 6 wickets
|  Verity 6-12 and 6-41; L F Townsend 6-38  
|- 
|2
| 17 May 1933
| Somerset<small>Rutland Recreation Ground, Ilkeston 
 |bgcolor="#00FF00"|Won 
| 7 wickets
|  T. B. Mitchell 5-46; MacDonald-Watson 5-27; L F Townsend 5-59  
|- 
|3
|20 May 1933
| Kent <small> County Ground, Derby
| style="background:#0f0;"|Won 
| 8 wickets
| Ames 143; W H Copson 5-38; T. B. Mitchell 8-92  
|- 
|4
|24 May 1933
| Leicestershire  Queen's Park, Chesterfield 
| style="background:#0f0;"|Won 
| Innings and 86 runs
|  GM Lee 107; T. B. Mitchell 6-40  
|- 
|5
| 27 May 1933
| Hampshire  United Services Recreation Ground, Portsmouth 
 |bgcolor="#FFCC00"|Drawn
|
|  Boyes 6-5; L F Townsend 7-35  
|- 
|6
| 31 May 1933
| Essex   County Ground, Derby 
| style="background:#0f0;"|Won 
| 8 wickets
|  H Storer 232; Taylor 134; T. B. Mitchell 5-80  
|- 
|7
| 03 Jun 1933
| Warwickshire Edgbaston, Birmingham 
| style="background:#f00;"|Lost 
| 8 wickets
|  Wyatt 166; Paine 5-38  
|- 
|8
| 07 Jun 1933
|  Worcestershire County Ground, New Road, Worcester 
 |bgcolor="#FFCC00"|Drawn
|
|  Walters 124; Perks 5-50  
|- 
|9
| 10 Jun 1933
| Leicestershire Park Road Ground, Loughborough 
| style="background:#0f0;"|Won 
| Innings and 77 runs
|  Berry 111; L F Townsend 233; T. B. Mitchell 6-36  
|- 
|10
| 14 Jun 1933 
| West Indies  County Ground, Derby 
 |bgcolor="#FFCC00"|Drawn
|
| Headley 200   
|- 
|11
| 17 Jun 1933
| Nottinghamshire    Trent Bridge, Nottingham 
| style="background:#f00;"|Lost 
| Innings and 121 runs
|  Carr 137; Staples 7-20  
|- 
|12
|  21 Jun 1933
| Gloucestershire <small>  Queen's Park, Chesterfield 
| style="background:#0f0;"|Won 
| 71 runs
| Goddard 5-49 and 6-52; L F Townsend 6-64 and 8-26  
|- 
|13
|24 Jun 1933
| SomersetAgricultural Showgrounds, Frome 
| style="background:#f00;"|Lost 
| 89 runs
| Ingle 103; T R Armstrong 7-57; Young 6-30   
|- 
|14
|  28 Jun 1933
| Lancashire   Park Road Ground, Buxton 
| style="background:#f00;"|Lost 
| 3 wickets
|  Sibbles 5-49; T. B. Mitchell 6-69  
|- 
|15
|  01 Jul 1933
| Nottinghamshire    Rutland Recreation Ground, Ilkeston 
| style="background:#f00;"|Lost 
| 57 runs
| A Staples 113; T S Worthington  108; S Staples 6-103  
|- 
|16
| 05 Jul 1933
| Essex   County Ground, Leyton 
| style="background:#fc0;"|Drawn
|
|  L F Townsend 151; Nichols 135; T Smith 6-112  
|- 
|17
| 08 Jul 1933
| Worcestershire  <small>  Queen's Park, Chesterfield 
| style="background:#0f0;"|Won 
| Innings and 234 runs
| T S Worthington  200*; T. B. Mitchell 5-20 and 6-44   
|- 
|18
| 15 Jul 1933
|  Sussex    County Ground, Derby 
| style="background:#f00;"|Lost 
| 6 wickets
| Parks 122; T. B. Mitchell 5-74; Langridge 5-63   
|- 
|19
| 22 Jul 1933
| Northamptonshire    Queen's Park, Chesterfield 
| style="background:#0f0;"|Won 
| 157 runs
| L F Townsend 99 and 106; Jupp 6–104; T R Armstrong 7-87   
|- 
|20
| 26 Jul 1933
|  Sussex    County Ground, Hove 
| style="background:#f00;"|Lost 
| 169 runs
|  W H Copson 5-59; Cornford 5-26; A V Pope 7-84  
|- 
|21
| 29 Jul 1933
| Middlesex   Queen's Park, Chesterfield 
| style="background:#f00;"|Lost 
| 8 wickets
| Sims 8-47; T. B. Mitchell 7-86; Hearne 9-61   
|- 
|22
|05 Aug 1933
| Warwickshire  County Ground, Derby 
| style="background:#0f0;"|Won 
| 317 runs
| L F Townsend 172; Wyatt 102; Paine 5-115   
|- 
|23
|09 Aug 1933
 | Kent  St Lawrence Ground, Canterbury
| style="background:#f00;"|Lost 
| 160 runs
| Woolley 161; W H Copson 5-62; Freeman 6-30 and 6-82  
|- 
|24
|12 Aug 1933
| Yorkshire  Queen's Park, Chesterfield 
| style="background:#fc0;"|Drawn
|
|  L F Townsend 100; T. B. Mitchell 6-66  
|- 
|25
| 16 Aug 1933
 |  Gloucestershire    College Ground, Cheltenham 
| style="background:#f00;"|Lost 
| Innings and 85 runs
|  Hammond 231; W H Copson 7-62; Parker 7-93;   
|- 
|26
|19 Aug 1933
| Hampshire  Rutland Recreation Ground, Ilkeston 
| style="background:#fc0;"|Drawn
|
| Mead 227; Hill 5-23   
|- 
|27
| 23 Aug 1933
| Middlesex     Lord's Cricket Ground, St John's Wood 
| style="background:#0f0;"|Won 
| 141 runs
| Judge 5-27; W H Copson 5-28; T. B. Mitchell 5-62 and 6-53   
|- 
|28
| 26 Aug 1933
| Northamptonshire   County Ground, Northampton 
| style="background:#0f0;"|Won 
| Innings and 184 runs
|  GM Lee 128; L F Townsend 142; D Smith  129*  
|- 
|29
| 30 Aug 1933
| Lancashire   Stanley Park, Blackpool 
| style="background:#fc0;"|Drawn
|
| Sibbles 5-62; T. B. Mitchell 8-38   
|-

Statistics

County Championship  batting averages

County Championship  bowling averages

Wicket Keeper

Harry Elliott Catches 64  Stumping 17

See also
Derbyshire County Cricket Club seasons
1933 English cricket season

References

1933 in English cricket
Derbyshire County Cricket Club seasons
English cricket seasons in the 20th century